Little Satan (Shaytân-e Kuchak;) is an anti-Zionist derogatory epithet used especially by Iranian leaders for Israel.

Usage history
According to some sources Ruhollah Khomeini, leader of Iranian Revolution, first used the term in its contemporary meaning. Israel was condemned as the "Little Satan" in 1979 by Khomeini when he was addressing Israel's backing of the Shah, its close ties to the US, and the ongoing Israeli–Palestinian conflict. 

According to other sources, such as the Glasgow Herald, Colonel Gaddafi of Libya stated that "Israel is the little Satan" in July 1980.

Former Prime Minister of Israel, Benjamin Netanyahu, used this phrase when referring to Iranian rhetoric during a visit to the United States stating that: "For the Mullahs that rule Tehran, Israel is the small Satan and America is the great Satan."

Contemporary use 
The term is often used by Islamist terrorists to recruit terrorists and by Shia speakers to propagate hatred towards Israel. The term also features heavily in contemporary Iranian propaganda.

In Fatima gate border, a Lebanese gate border near Israel, two pillars have been erected for people to perform a symbolic stoning of little Satan (Israel) and great Satan (the United States). It is hoped that Lebanese people will perform this act instead of throwing stones at Israeli soldiers. Hezbollah, which has the same political ideology as Iran, also refers to Israel as the Zionist entity and as little Satan.

Analysis

See also
 Great Satan
 Iran–Israel relations
 Anti-Zionism
 Antisemitism in Iran
 Zionist entity

References

Iran–Israel relations
Political terminology of Iran
Political catchphrases
Political slurs
Anti-Zionism in the Middle East
Anti-Western sentiment
Ruhollah Khomeini